Mohammed Emdadul Haque Milon  (born 25 February 1993 in Dhaka, Bangladesh) is a Bangladeshi archer. He competed in the individual event at the 2012 Summer Olympics.

References

External links
 

Bangladeshi male archers
1987 births
Living people
Archers at the 2012 Summer Olympics
Olympic archers of Bangladesh
Archers at the 2010 Asian Games
Archers at the 2014 Asian Games
Archers at the 2010 Summer Youth Olympics
Archers at the 2018 Asian Games
Asian Games competitors for Bangladesh